The Men's long jump event took place on July 10, 2011, at the Kobe Universiade Memorial Stadium.

Medalists

Records

Results

Final

References

2011 Asian Athletics Championships
Long jump at the Asian Athletics Championships